AQR Capital Management (Applied Quantitative Research) is a global investment management firm based in Greenwich, Connecticut, United States. The firm, which was founded in 1998 by Cliff Asness, David Kabiller, John Liew, and Robert Krail, offers a variety of quantitatively driven alternative and traditional investment vehicles to both institutional clients and financial advisors. The firm is primarily owned by its founders and principals. AQR has additional offices in Boston, Chicago, Los Angeles, Bangalore, Hong Kong, London, Sydney, and Tokyo.

Investment philosophy and strategies
AQR employs a research-based "systematic and consistent approach" to portfolio construction.  This disciplined approach of identifying long-term, repeatable sources of return means "having a high conviction in the process, but not a high conviction in any particular stock".   The firm is a strong proponent of diversification within portfolios, as well as adding strategies with low correlation to traditional asset classes as a complement to existing portfolios.

AQR was an early adopter of style, or factor, investing given the strategy's academic roots.  Although the four styles — value, momentum, defensive and carry — have been well-known and used in quantitative investing for decades,  AQR has long advocated for using these styles together, citing their diversifying qualities.

AQR is perhaps best known for its alternative investment strategies, which aim to offer low correlation to traditional, equity-dominated portfolios. AQR was one of the first investment managers to offer a risk parity strategy, which aims to balance allocations based on underlying risk rather than asset classes. The firm also offers managed futures, a trend-following strategy that is “uncorrelated with other asset classes” and supported by over a century of academic evidence.

AQR was one of the first investment management firms to offer alternative mutual funds, launching its family of mutual funds in 2009.  The firm's liquid alternative strategies were a “category leader” in Morningstar’s ranking for 2015.

History
Three of AQR's founding principals — Cliff Asness, Robert Krail and John Liew — met in the University of Chicago’s PhD program, where the foundation of the firm's investment philosophy took shape.

While still working on his dissertation, which focused on momentum and value, Asness joined Goldman Sachs, where he was asked to lead a new quantitative research team within the firm's asset management division. Liew and Krail joined him, and the new team applied what they learned in academia to manage both hedge-fund and long-only assets.

In 1998, Asness, David Kabiller, Krail and Liew left Goldman Sachs to establish AQR.

AQR was among the first hedge fund managers to voluntarily register at its inception with the Securities and Exchange Commission. The firm's first product was a hedge fund, though it soon (2000) entered into traditional portfolio management. In 2001, AQR had nearly $750 million assets under management. In 2004, AQR had $12 billion assets under management. The firm opened its first international office in Australia in 2005.

In 2009, AQR became one of the first investment managers to offer alternative mutual funds. In 2011, the firm opened an office in the UK.

As of Q3 2019, the firm had $185 billion in assets under management.

After AQR Annual Profit plunged 34% in 2018, the management firm announced job cuts in January 2019.

Assets under management

Ties to academia
As of 2016, approximately half of the AQR's employees have earned advanced degrees, with 52 holding PhDs.

In 2015, AQR established QUANTA Academy, the firm's learning and development program, which is focused on three core pillars: Technical Skills and Knowledge, Leadership and Management, and Personal Enrichment. With a focus on lifelong learning, the program is designed to help employees reach their full potential through hundreds of courses annually.

AQR's Insight Award (see below), which “recognizes the most significant and innovative academic research that offers practical applications for investors,” awarded its fifth annual slate of winners in 2016.

In 2014, AQR partnered with the London Business School to establish The AQR Asset Management Institute, which focuses on asset management research and thought leadership. The Institute rewards scholars in the field with annual grants and prizes. AQR donated more than $15 million to be spread out over ten years.

The firm is also a sponsor of the AQR Top Finance Graduate Award at Copenhagen Business School, which honors the PhD graduates whose research carries the greatest potential impact.

References

External links
 Official website

Hedge fund firms of the United States
Hedge fund firms in Connecticut
Financial services companies established in 1998
1998 establishments in Connecticut
Hedge funds
Investment management companies of the United States